Elymnias vitellia  is a butterfly in the family Nymphalidae. It was described by Caspar Stoll in 1781. It is found in the Indomalayan realm.

Subspecies
E. v. vitellia (Ambon, Saparua, Serang)
E. v. viminalis Wallace, 1869 (Buru)

References

External links
"Elymnias Hübner, 1818" at Markku Savela's Lepidoptera and Some Other Life Forms

vitellia
Butterflies of Asia
Taxa named by Caspar Stoll
Butterflies described in 1781